Fred Poland was a professional association footballer who played as a centre forward. He was signed by Burnley in April 1888. He had played football in Scotland for Dundee Our Boys.

Career

Pre-Football League
Poland moved to Lancashire from Scotland in search of work. He let it be known around Burnley that he was a footballer, having played at senior level in Scotland, and also that he was both a goalscorer and a goalkeeper. The football club heard about him and invited him to play in a friendly match against Newton Heath at Turf Moor. He played at centre-forward, exceeding expectations by scoring two goals in a 7-1 victory. He continued to play well and score goals as the 1887–1888 season drew to a close, and was retained by Burnley for the forthcoming inaugural Football League season.

1888-1889 
Poland made his league début on 8 September 1888, as a forward, against Preston North End at Deepdale. The home team defeated Burnley 5–2, Poland scoring his team's second. He made nine appearances, from a possible 22 league games played by Burnley in season 1888–89, and scored five league goals.

References

Scottish footballers
Association football forwards
Dundee Our Boys F.C. players
Burnley F.C. players
Manchester United F.C. players
English Football League players
Year of birth missing
Year of death missing